Erwin Menny (18 August 1893 – 6 December 1949) was a German general (Generalleutnant) in the Heer during World War II who commanded several divisions. He was a recipient of the Knight's Cross of the Iron Cross of Nazi Germany.

He was taken prisoner with his 84th Infantry Division in the Falaise Pocket on 21 August 1944.

Awards and decorations
 Knight's Cross of the Iron Cross on 26 December 1941 as Oberst and commander of 15. Schützen-Brigade

See also

References

Citations

Bibliography

 

1893 births
1949 deaths
German Army personnel of World War I
German prisoners of war in World War II held by the United States
Lieutenant generals of the German Army (Wehrmacht)
Officers of the Military Order of Savoy
People from the Rhine Province
People from Trier-Saarburg
Recipients of the clasp to the Iron Cross, 1st class
Recipients of the Knight's Cross of the Iron Cross
German Army generals of World War II